László Szekeres (July 4, 1921 in Győr, Hungary – January 9, 2012 in Szeged, Hungary). Professor Emeritus, Institute of Pharmacology and Therapeutics, Medical Faculty of the University of Szeged, Hungary. He has held a number of notable positions and received a number of awards. His research contributed to the development of cardiac drugs.

Education 
He graduated from high school in Győr and in 1949 he graduated at the Medical School of the University of Pécs. He worked as intern in the Institute of Pharmacology at the same university. His original plan was to become a clinical physician, but after graduation he decided to stay in the Institute of Pharmacology. In 1959 and 1960 he did a few months postgraduate work in Moscow and Leningrad (now St. Petersburg) in the Pharmacological Institutes of the USSR Academy of Medical Sciences. In 1960-61 he completed a Riker fellowship at the Department of Pharmacology of the University of Oxford. In 1963 he spent two months in the "Istituto Superiore di Sanitá" in Rome to study methods concerning cerebral circulation with the Nobel-prize laureate Professor Bovet. In 1982 he studied at the National Institute of Health and at the Food and Drug Administration in Washington, DC.

Work: Early period (1950–1960) 
He researched cardiac metabolic changes due to hypoxia, ischaemia, hypothermia and cardiovascular drugs.

Work: Experimental cardiac arrhythmia (1960–1971)
He became interested in experimental cardiac arrhythmia and antiarrhythmic drugs, area rather unexplored at that time. Worked with Dr. E. M. Vaughan Williams comparing the electrophysiological actions of different antiarrhythmic drugs. The result of their cooperation formed the basis of 'Vaughan Williams Classification' of antiarrhythmic drugs. Returning home he developed new models for the assessment of antiarrhythmic action, which were soon widely applied. He also studied the electrophysiologic changes due to drugs, ischemia or heart failure. The results and data on experimental cardiac arrhythmias and antiarrhythmic drugs were summarized with his co-authorship in the first comprehensive monograph written on this topic.

Work: Next decade (1970–1983)
Search for methods to prevent sudden cardiac death due to acute myocardial infarction. First a new, (widely appreciated) model of experimental angina pectoris was developed. With the help of this method a number of antianginal and other cardiac drugs as well as their effect on hemodynamic and cardiac metabolic changes were studied.
In addition it was for the first time shown that reorganization of the phospholipid structure of the myocardial membrane by linoleic acid-rich diet offers a marked protection against life-threatening arrhythmias due to coronary artery occlusion in rats. All these results and literature on epidemiology and pathophysiology of sudden cardiac death as well as on possible therapeutic measures were summarized in a monograph.

Work: Latest research period (1983–)
He studied the effects of prostacyclin and its stable analogue: 7-oxo-prostacyclin in the experimental dog model of angina pectoris. A detailed analysis of the phenomenon of delayed anti-anginal action revealed that PgI2-pretreatment protected against consequences of ischaemia, such as early morphological changes, early and late postocclusion and reperfusion arrhythmias due to coronary artery occlusion or ouabain intoxication.
This endogenous 'self-defense' due to delayed adaptation to stress is promising also as a future trend in therapy since it works in experimental atherosclerosis too. Exploratory investigations suggest that the phenomenon is not confined to the heart only, vessels and possibly other organs could be also involved.
He was the founder of the "Szeged school of cardiovascular pharmacology" of international reputation, a number of his former pupils and co-workers became professors and leading scientists, and among them six became chairmen of Departments of Pharmacology in Hungary.

Major research interests and contributions 
His major scientific interests and contributions included the first comprehensive analysis of the mode of action of antiarrhythmic drugs, the elucidation of the mechanism of cardiac arrhythmias, and that of the antiarrhythmic and anti-anginal drugs. He also developed several "in vivo" models of experimental arrhythmias as well as of that of angina pectoris for testing antiarrhythmic and anti-anginal drugs. Professor Szekeres also contributed to the discovery of drug induced delayed cardiac adaptation to stress. He was interested in the pathomechanism and pharmacological prevention of cardiac arrhythmias and the consequences of myocardial ischaemia.

Family 
He married Lenke Rudas MD, former associate professor in the Department of Dentistry of the University of Pécs and later of the University of Szeged (Died 1990). They had two daughters: Julia Barthó-Szekeres MD. PhD. DSc., Professor and Head of the Department of Microbiology at the University of Pécs (born 1950) and Zsuzsa Szekeres MD, pediatrician in Budapest (born 1954). In 1993 he married Ibolya Pamuk.

Positions 
 1946-1967 assistant professor, lecturer, and reader at the University of Pécs.
 1967-1991 Professor and Director of the Department of Pharmacology, University Medical School of Szeged (later Albert Szent-Györgyi Medical University) Hungary.
 1968-1977: Pro-rector of the University Medical School of Szeged.
 1967-1978: Chairman of the Scientific Committee of Szeged University. Editor of Studia Medica Szegediensis.
 He worked as member of the Drug Research Committee of the Hungarian Academy of Sciences (1958–89), as well as of the Scientific Qualification Committee (1958–80)

Qualifications 
 1949, M.D.(summa cum laude), University of Pécs
 1952, Board certification in Laboratory Sciences
 1957, PhD (Candidate of Sciences);
 1965, DSc; (Academic Doctor in Hungary)
 1981, Board certification in Clinical Pharmacology.

Honorary degrees and memberships 
 1984, Honorary Doctor, Nikolai Kopernik University of Cracow, Poland
 1987, Honorary Doctor, Karl Eberhard Universitaet, Tübingen, Germany
 1979, Member: Deutsche Akademie der Naturforscher 'Leopoldina'
 1983, Honorary Member of the Czechoslovak Pharmacological Society
 1988, Honorary Member of the Polish Physiological Society
 2001, Founding Fellow of the International Society for Heart Research
 2002, Fellow of the International Academy of Cardiovascular Sciences

Memberships and positions in scientific societies 
 Since the first Prague Meeting member of the International Society for Heart Research (ISHR).
 Councillor of ISHR (1983–1992)
 1983-1992 Councillor of the European Section of ISHR
 Founder and president of the East-European Subsection of ISHR 1984-1993. Promoted the Subsection's joining the European Section.
 1962-Hungarian Pharmacological Society (founding member and member of the Board) President of the Society (1991–1995) From 2000 on honorary president of the Society
 1990-1994 Member of the Nominating Committee of IUPHAR
 1993-1995 Representative of Hungary in the Board of the Federation of European Pharmacological Societies
 1949-Hungarian Physiological Society
 1962-Deutsche Pharmakologische Gesellschaft
 1973-The New York Academy of Sciences
 1981-British Pharmacological Society
 1983-Hungarian Society of Cardiology; Founder & President of Experimental Section until 1994
 1972-'Korányi Sándor' Society of Internal Medicine

Editorial boards 
 J. Cardiovascular Pharmacology, since foundation (1974–1988)
 European J. Pharmacology, since foundation (1966–1975)
 Progress in Pharmacology, since foundation (1974–1988)
 Basic Research in Cardiology, since foundation (from Zeitschrift für Kreislaufforschung) (1978–1994)
 Cardioscience, since foundation (1989–1996)
 Rhythmology, since foundation (1987–1996)
 Canadian J. Cardiology (1987–1998)
 British J. Pharmacology,(Corresponding editor, 1981–1998)
 Archives Internationales de Pharmacodynamie et de Thérapie, since 1975.
 Journal de Pharmacologie (Paris), since 1985
 Pharmacological Research Communications, Societá Italiana di Farmacologia;since 1976)
 Acta Medica Hungarica since 1974

Awards and distinctions 
 1964 'Carolus Linnaeus' Medal of the Karolinska Institutet (Stockholm)
 1976 'N.P.Krawkow' Medal of the USSR Medical Academy
 1980 Bronze Medal of the Helsinki University
 1978 'Jancsó Miklós' Award and Medal of the Szeged University Medical School
 1978 Hungarian State Gold Medal of the "Order of Labor"
 1979 and 1988 Awards of the Hungarian Ministry of Education and Culture for high standard textbook & monograph
 1984 "Issekutz Béla" Award & medal of the Hungarian Pharmacological Society
 1987 "Napoleon Czybulsky" Medal of the Polish Physiological Society
 1990 the first "Gábor György"Award and Medal of the Hungarian Society of Cardiology
 2001 the first "Pro Universitate" Award and Medal of the University of Szeged
 2001 Medal of Merit of ISHR
 2002 the first "Howard Morgan Award for Distinguished Achievements in Cardiovascular Sciences" from the International Academy of Cardiovascular Sciences.
 In 2002 at a satellite meeting of ISHR in Stará Lesna (Slovakia) as well as at the XXII. Congress of the European section of ISHR in Szeged he was honoured by denominating the symposia dealing with cardiac arrhythmia: Szekeres Symposium:

Participation in scientific conferences and symposia 
Since 1948 he regularly participated and gave lectures in Hungary and abroad at national and international congresses and symposia including most European countries, USA, Canada, Australia, Israel, Japan, India and China.

Publications 
He had 295 articles in scientific journals, wrote 76 book chapters, 304 abstracts and 7 edited books. Although publications of L. Szekeres started from 1948, the number of citations (2260) and the impact factor (238.25) are taken into account only for the period of 1961-2005.
The following is a list of his most important works.

a./ Monographs:
 Szekeres L., Papp J.Gy.: "Experimental Cardiac Arrhythmias and Antiarrhythmic Drugs". Akadémiai kiadó Budapest 1971(448 pp)

 Szekeres L.: "Orvosi Gyógyszertan" (Textbook of Medical Pharmacology in Hungarian), Medicina Könyvkiadó, Budapest 1980, 693 pp.

 Szekeres L.: "Sudden Death due to Acute Myocardial Infarction" CRC Press, Inc. Boca Raton, Florida, 1986, 288 pp.

 Solti F., Szabó Z., Szekeres L.: "Aritmiák" ("Arrhythmias" in Hungarian) Medicina Könyvkiadó (Publishing House), Budapest 1987, 181 pp.

 Szekeres László :A szívglykozidoktól a gyógyszeres stressadaptációig. Egy ötvenéves kutatómunka tanulságai. (From the cardiac glycosides to the pharmacological adaptation to stress. The lesson of 50 years research activity. Studia Physiologica 7. Ed: S. Juhász –Nagy, Scientia Kiadó, Budapest. 2000, (95.pp)

b./ Most important edited books:
 Szekeres L.: "Adrenergic Activators and Inhibitors";Handbook of Experimental Pharmacology, Springer Verlag, Berlin, 1980. Vol. 54/1,1210 pp., Vol. 54/2, 936 pp,

 Szekeres L., Papp J.Gy.: "Pharmacology of Smooth Muscle". Handbook of Experimental Pharmacology, Springer Verlag, Berlin, Heidelberg, New York, London, Paris, Tokyo, Hong Kong, Barcelona, Budapest, 1980. Vol. 111. 727 pp.

The most important scientific publications:

1. Szekeres L. [A szívglycosidoktól a gyógyszeres stressadaptációig. Egy ötvenéves kutatómunka tanulságai.] In: Juhász-Nagy S, editor. Studia Physiologica 7. Budapest: Scientia Kiadó; 2000. p. 1–95.

2. Szekeres L, Schein M. Cell metabolism of the overloaded mammalian heart in situ. Kardiologia (Basel) 1959; 34: 19–27.

3. Szekeres L, Méhes J, Papp J Gy. Mechanism of increased susceptibility to fibrillation of the hypothermic mammalian heart in situ. Br J Pharmacol 1961; 17: 167–175.

4. Szekeres L, Papp JG. Experimental Cardiac Arrhythmias and Antiarrhythmic Drugs. (Monograph) Budapest: Akadémiai Kiadó; 1971. p. 1-448.

5. Vaughan Williams EM, Szekeres L. A comparison of tests for antifibrillatory action. Br J Pharmacol 1961; 17: 424–432.

6. Szekeres L, Vaughan Williams EM. Antifibrillatory action. J Physiol (London) 1962; 160: 470–482.

7. Szekeres L, Szurgent J. A new type of electrode for continuous recording of monophasic action potentials from the heart in situ. Cardiovasc Res 1974; 8:132–137.(Note: Important methodological innovation)

8. Szekeres L, Csik V, Udvary E. Nitroglycerin and dipyridamole on cardiac metabolism and dynamics in a new experimental model of angina pectoris. J Pharmacol Exp Ther 1976; 196: 15–28. (Note: Important methodological innovation)

9. Lepran I, Koltai M, Siegmund W, Szekeres L. Coronary artery ligation, early arrhythmias, and determination of the ischemic area in conscious rats. J Pharmacol Methods 1983; 9: 219–230. (Note: Important methodological innovation)

10. Lepran I, Nemecz G, Koltai M, Szekeres L. Effect of a linoleic acid-rich diet on the acute phase of coronary occlusion in conscious rats: influence of indomethacin and aspirin. J Cardiovasc Pharmacol 1981; 3: 847–853. (Note: worldwide the first exact experimental demonstration of the protection from lethal arrhythmias due to coronary occlusion of a diet rich in unsaturated fatty acids)

11. Szekeres L, Udvary E, Vegh A. Nifedipine effects in severe myocardial ischaemia in the dog due to left anterior descending coronary occlusion with left circumflex coronary artery constriction. Br J Pharmacol 1987; 91: 127–37. (Note: Important methodological innovation)

12. Csete K, Kovacs GL, Szekeres L. Disturbance of motoric function as behavioral measure of impaired cerebral circulation in mice. Physiol Behav 1986; 36: 409–412. (Note: Important methodological innovation)

13. Szekeres L. Sudden Death due to Acute Myocardial Infarction. (A monograph) Boca Raton, Florida: CRC Press Inc.; 1986. p. 1- 288.

14. Szekeres L. On the mechanism and possible therapeutic application of delayed cardiac adaptation to stress. Can J Cardiol
1996;12: 177–185. Note: Drug or physical loading induced late appearing protection of the heart from severe stress by adaptation to stress

15. Szekeres L. Delayed adaptation to stress. A clinically useful form of cardiac protection. Exp Clin Cardiol 2000; 5: 116–121.
(Note: Drug or physical loading induced late appearing protection of the heart from severe stress by adaptation to stress)

16. Szekeres L., Pharmacological induction of delayed and prolonged cardiac protection: The role of prostanoids. Experimental & Clinical Cardiol. 9: 7–12, 2004. Note: Drug or physical loading induced late appearing protection of the heart from severe stress by adaptation to stress

17. Udvary E, Vegh A, Szekeres L. 7-oxo-PGI2 induced late protective action from arrhythmias due to local myocardial ischemia. Bratisl Lek Listy 1991; 92: 146–149. Note: Demonstration of unlimited prolongation of cardiac protection from severe stress by adaptation to stress

18. Szekeres L, Szilvássy Z, Ferdinandy P, et al. Delayed cardiac protection against harmful consequences of stress can be induced in experimental atherosclerosis in rabbits. J Mol Cell Cardiol 1997; 29: 1977–1983.

19. L. Szekeres (1995) Drug induced delayed cardiac protection against the effects of myocardial ischemia Pharmacology and Therapeutics, 108: 269-280

Footnotes

References 
 Cardiovascular Pharmacology'87 Ed: J.Gy. Papp, Akadémiai Kiadó Budapest,1987 (650 pp) Festschrift on the occasion of the 20th anniversary of Professor Szekeres' appointment as chairman of the Szeged Department of Pharmacology. Original contributions of 60 leading cardiovascular scientists of the world.

 Scientific works of László Szekeres. Bibliography 1948-1991 Ed: Dr. Papp Gyula Szegedi Nyomda 1991 (66 pp)

 Szegedi Egyetemi Almanach (Szeged University Almanac) Ed: Dr. A. Dobozy SZOTE Nyomda, Szeged 1997 (493pp)

 Új Magyar Lexikon 7 (New Hungarian Encyclopaedia 7) Ed: K. Ákos, Akadémiai Kiadó, Budapest 1972 (471 pp)

 Who is Who in the World. Marquis New Providence (USA) from the 5th edition 1980/81 continuously

 Who is Who in Science and Engineering. Marquis New Providence (USA) from the 4th edition 1998/99 continuously

 CV Network of International Academy of Cardiovascular Sciences Vol:1, No:4 p:7
 2002 Howard Morgan Award honoree László Szekeres

 A magyar szívkutatók nemzetközi mérlegen. (International evaluation of Hungarian cardiac researchers), S, Juhász Nagy, Semmelweis University of Medical Sciences

 A Gábor György alapítvány Nagydíjának kitüntetettje –1990 Dr Szekeres László (Laureate of the Grand Prize of the George Gábor Foundation: Dr László Szekeres-1990) Cardiologica Hungarica 34: E3 2004.

 Walker.M.J.A. Antiarrhythmic Drug Research. Br, J, Pharmacol :2006, 147: S222-S231

 Achievements of Professor Emeritus László Szekeres. Eds: Dr. Gyula Papp, Dr. András Varró, Dr. Ágnes Végh, Department of Pharmacology and Pharmacotherapy, University of Szeged 2011

External links
 László Szekeres, the oldest member of the BPS!! (British Pharmacological Society blog)

Hungarian pharmacologists
1921 births
2012 deaths